These are the official results of the Women's Javelin Throw event at the 1999 World Championships in Seville, Spain. There were a total number of 30 participating athletes, with the final held on Saturday 28 August 1999.

Medalists

Schedule
All times are Central European Time (UTC+1)

Abbreviations
All results shown are in metres

Startlist

Records
''A new javelin was introduced, officially from April 1, 1999

Qualification

Group A

Group B

Final

See also
2000 Women's Olympic Javelin Throw (Sydney)

References

todor66
trackandfieldnews

D
Javelin throw at the World Athletics Championships
1999 in women's athletics